The Qatar national cricket team is the team that represents Qatar in international cricket. The team is organised by the Qatar Cricket Association, which became an affiliate member of the International Cricket Council (ICC) in 1999 and an associate member in 2017.

Qatar made its international debut in 1979, at an invitational tournament that also included Bahrain, Kuwait, and Sharjah (one of the United Arab Emirates). The team's first Asian Cricket Council (ACC) event was the 2002 ACC Trophy in Singapore. For a period during the 2000s, Qatar was one of the top-ranked non-Test teams in Asia – at the 2004 ACC Trophy, the team placed fourth. However, a few years later it was relegated to the second-division ACC events.

Qatar made its first and only World Cricket League (WCL) appearance at the 2017 ICC World Cricket League Division Five event in South Africa. It placed third, enough to secure the team a place in the new 2019–21 ICC Cricket World Cup Challenge League.

History

International competition

Qatar's international debut came in 2002 at the ACC Trophy, where they failed to progress beyond the first round. A major improvement came in the next tournament in 2004 when they came fourth. This qualified them for the final pre-qualifying tournament for the 2005 ICC Trophy, played in Malaysia in early 2005. They finished fourth in that tournament, thereby dropping off the road to qualification to the 2007 World Cup. They once again competed at the ACC Trophy in 2006, this time finishing in eighth place. They will play in the new Champions division of that tournament in 2008.

2018–present
In April 2018, the ICC decided to grant full Twenty20 International (T20I) status to all its members. Therefore, all Twenty20 matches played between Qatar and other ICC members after 1 January 2019 will be a full T20I.

Qatar made its Twenty20 International debut on 21 January 2019, defeating Saudi Arabia by 4 wickets in the 2019 ACC Western Region T20 at Al Emarat Cricket Stadium, Muscat, Oman.

Tournament history

Asia Cup Qualifier 
2018: Did not participate
2020: Did not qualify

ACC Western Region T20
2019: Runner up
2020: Semi Finals

ACC Trophy 
2002: First round
2004: 4th place
2006: 8th place
2008 Elite: 9th place
2010 Challenge: 3rd place

World Cricket League
2017 ICC World Cricket League Division Five: 3rd place

ACC Twenty20 Cup

2007: First round
2009: 9th place

Youth cricket
Qatar have fielded sides in regional competition at Under 15, Under 17 and Under 19 levels.

Under 15s
The Qatar Under 15 team competed in Asia Cup tournaments in 2002, 2005 and 2006. They failed to progress beyond the first round on all occasions. Even after losing just one game (against Oman) in the group stage of the 2006 competition, they were not allowed to play in the semi-finals as they did not abide by the qualification rules.

Under 17s
The Qatar Under 17 team competed in the Asia Cup for the first time in 2004, where they did not progress past the first round. In 2005, they reached the quarter finals. Currently practicing for next event, under the guidance of coach Abdulrahman.

Under 19s
The Under 19 team has participated in Asia Cup tournaments in 2001, 2003 and 2005, reaching the semi finals on the 2003 & 2005 editions. In the 2001 they came runner up in the plate league. Qatar recently also took part in the U-19 Asia Cup although they had a poor time of it. 
Qatar advanced to Asia Division 2 Semi finals of 2020 Under-19 Cricket World Cup qualification where they lost to Kuwait. They failed to advance from the group stage of Asia Division 2 during 2018 World cup qualification process.

Home ground 

West End Park International Cricket Stadium is a home ground of team located in Doha. This is the first cricket stadium in Qatar. In June 2013, the ground was opened for cricket with opening of the Grand Mall Hypermarket on its premise. The stadium can seat 13,000. In December 2013, it was announced the hosting of first-ever triangular women’s One-day and Twenty20 championship in Qatar in January 2014. Women’s international teams from the Pakistan, South Africa and Ireland participated in the seven championship matches. This was the first championship ever to be sanctioned by the International Cricket Council.

In 2015, the stadium was selected to host 1st edition of Pakistan Super League matches which will be played in February, 2016.

Current squad
This lists all players who were in the most recent List A or T20I squads.
Updated as on 23 December 2022

Records

International Match Summary — Qatar
 
Last updated 23 December 2022

Twenty20 International 
 Highest team total: 206/7 v. Kuwait on 6 July 2019 at West End Park International Cricket Stadium, Doha.
 Highest individual score: 88*, Muhammad Tanveer v. Bahrain on 18 December 2022 at UKM-YSD Cricket Oval, Bangi.
 Best individual bowling figures: 4/14, Nouman Sarwar v. Jersey on 11 October 2019 at West End Park International Cricket Stadium, Doha.

Most T20I runs for Qatar

Most T20I wickets for Qatar

T20I record versus other nations

Records complete to T20I #1980. Last updated 23 December 2022.

See also
 List of Qatar Twenty20 International cricketers
 Qatar women's national cricket team

External links
Qatar on ACC

References

Cricket in Qatar
National cricket teams
Cricket
Qatar in international cricket